The primary election for the 1984 United States Senate election in Louisiana was held on September 29, 1984.

Incumbent Senator J. Bennett Johnston won the election with 85% of the vote and was declared elected by a majority, dispelling the need for a general election in November.

Candidates

Democratic Party
 J. Bennett Johnston, incumbent Senator

Republican Party
 Larry Napoleon "Boogaloo" Cooper, former President of the NAACP Youth Council and candidate for Lt. Governor in 1983
 Robert M. Ross, perennial candidate

Results

Primary election

General election
Under Section 511 of Title 18 of the Louisiana Revised Statutes, a candidate who received a majority of the votes in the Primary Election was declared elected. Johnston did not appear on the General Election ballot.

See also 
 1984 United States Senate elections

References 

1984
Louisiana
United States Senate